Mathieu Jaminet (born 24 October 1994) is a French racing driver. He is currently employed by Porsche as a factory driver and participates primarily in endurance racing, including the Intercontinental GT Challenge, the Blancpain GT Series Endurance Cup, and the North American Endurance Championship within IMSA's WeatherTech SportsCar Championship.

Career
Jaminet originally began pursuing a career in formula racing, participating in the F4 Eurocup 1.6 championship in 2010 and the Eurocup Formula Renault 2.0 championship in 2011. Following this, he moved between several racing series over the next years before entering the Porsche Carrera Cup France championship in 2015. After finishing second in his debut season there, he was named a Porsche Junior Driver for the 2016 season. Jaminet won the Carrera Cup championship in 2016 and took third in the Porsche Supercup championship, prompting Porsche to promote him to a "Young Professional."

For 2017, Jaminet participated primarily in ADAC GT Masters, driving for KÜS TEAM75 Bernhard. He, along with teammate Michael Ammermüller, finished eight in the championship, including a win at the first race of the season. Jaminet also made appearances in other series, including a handful of starts in the Pirelli World Challenge, two starts in the GT Daytona class of the WeatherTech SportsCar Championship, a participation in the 24 Hours of Spa.

Jaminet continued in ADAC GT Masters in 2018 ADAC GT Masters, this time driving for Precote Herberth Motorsport. He and teammate Robert Renauer won the championship, resulting in Jaminet earning more international race outings and a place on the North American Porsche GT Team to drive endurance races in the WeatherTech SportsCar Championship, as well as a chance to drive the 2019 24 Hours of Le Mans.

For the 2020 season, Jaminet was promoted to a full Porsche factory driver. He continues to drive the North American endurance events with the Porsche GT Team, as well as participating in international GT3 events.

Personal life
Jaminet currently resides in Woippy, France.

Racing results

24 Hours of Le Mans

24 Hours of Daytona

Bathurst 12 Hour

IMSA SportsCar Championship
(key) (Races in bold indicate pole position) (Races in italics indicate fastest lap)

* Season still in progress

References

1994 births
Living people
French racing drivers
24 Hours of Le Mans drivers
24 Hours of Daytona drivers
12 Hours of Sebring drivers
Porsche Supercup drivers
24 Hours of Spa drivers
Formula Renault Eurocup drivers
Blancpain Endurance Series drivers
ADAC GT Masters drivers
WeatherTech SportsCar Championship drivers
People from Hayange
24H Series drivers
Sportspeople from Moselle (department)
Porsche Motorsports drivers
Auto Sport Academy drivers
Karting World Championship drivers
Josef Kaufmann Racing drivers
Formula Renault 2.0 NEC drivers
Rowe Racing drivers
ART Grand Prix drivers
French F4 Championship drivers
Nürburgring 24 Hours drivers
Toksport WRT drivers
Craft-Bamboo Racing drivers
Team Penske drivers